El Pueblo Ribera Court is a complex of twelve duplexes at 230–248 Gravilla Street and 230–309 Playa del Sur in La Jolla, San Diego, California. It was designed in 1923 by the Austrian-American Rudolf Schindler. Schindler's most famous works are in and around Los Angeles; El Pueblo Ribera is his only work in San Diego.

History
The complex was built in Modern architectural style. Each unit originally consisted of a bedroom on the ground level, and a sleeping porch on the upper level. Each unit enjoys a view of La Jolla's Windansea Beach. 

The San Diego Historical Society declared the complex a historic district in 1977 (historic site #117).

References

 Columbia School of Architecture, "El Pueblo Ribera"
 University of Waterloo (Canada), "El Pueblo Ribera Court - Residential Lighting Study"
 http://www.hottr6.com/pueblo/

External links

Neighborhoods in San Diego
Houses completed in 1923
Historic districts in San Diego
Landmarks in San Diego
Rudolph Schindler buildings
1923 establishments in California